

E 

 
 
 
 
 
 1205 Ebella
 
 
 
 
 
 
 
 
 
 
 60558 Echeclus
 11887 Echemmon
 
 
 
 
 
 
 60 Echo
 
 1750 Eckert
 
 
 
 
 
 
 
 413 Edburga
 673 Edda
 
 
 
 
 
 
 
 
 
 
 
 
 742 Edisona
 517 Edith
 
 
 
 
 
 
 1341 Edmée
 
 1761 Edmondson
 
 445 Edna
 
 
 
 
 
 
 
 
 
 
 340 Eduarda
 
 
 
 
 
 2440 Educatio
 
 
 
 
 
 
 
 9260 Edwardolson
 
 
 
 
 1046 Edwin
 
 
 
 
 6002 Eetion
 
 
 2754 Efimov
 
 
 
 
 
 
 
 3103 Eger
 13 Egeria
 
 
 
 
 
 
 
 
 
 
 
 
 9826 Ehrenfreund
 
 
 
 
 
 
 442 Eichsfeldia
 
 
 
 
 
 
 
 
 
 
 2001 Einstein
 15440 Eioneus
 
 
 
 
 
 
 
 
 
 694 Ekard
 
 
 
 
 
 
 
 
 
 858 El Djezaïr
 
 2311 El Leoncito
 
 
 
 
 
 
 
 
 
 
 
 31824 Elatus
 
 
 
 
 
 130 Elektra
 
 
 
 
 
 354 Eleonora
 
 567 Eleutheria
 
 618 Elfriede
 
 
 
 
 
 1329 Eliane
 
 
 
 
 
 
 
 
 
 
 956 Elisa
 412 Elisabetha
 
 
 
 
 
 
 
 
 
 
 
 
 
 
 50719 Elizabethgriffin
 
 
 
 
 
 
 
 
 
 
 
 
 
 435 Ella
 
 
 
 
 
 
 
 
 
 
 
 
 
 
 
 
 
 616 Elly
 
 
 
 
 
 
 
 
 59 Elpis
 182 Elsa
 
 
 
 
 
 3936 Elst
 7968 Elst-Pizarro
 
 
 277 Elvira
 
 
 1234 Elyna
 
 17795 Elysiasegal
 
 
 
 
 576 Emanuela
 
 
 
 
 
 
 
 
 
 
 
 
 
 
 
 
 
 
 
 
 
 
 
 
 
 
 14627 Emilkowalski
 
 
 
 
 
 
 
 
 
 
 
 
 
 
 
 481 Emita
 283 Emma
 
 
 
 
 
 
 
 
 
 
 5391 Emmons
 
 
 
 
 
 
 4282 Endate
 
 
 342 Endymion
 
 
 4217 Engelhardt
 
 7548 Engström
 
 
 
 
 
 
 4709 Ennomos
 
 
 
 
 
 
 
 
 
 
 
 
 
 
 
 
 
 
 
 
 6433 Enya
 
 221 Eos
 
 5259 Epeigeus
 2148 Epeios
 
 
 
 
 1810 Epimetheus
 
 
 
 
 
 
 802 Epyaxa
 
 
 
 62 Erato
 
 
 
 
 3674 Erbisbühl
 
 
 
 894 Erda
 
 
 
 
 
 
 
 
 4954 Eric
 
 
 
 
 
 
 
 
 
 
 
 
 
 
 
 
 
 
 
 
 
 
 
 
 
 
 
 
 
 
 
 
 
 
 
 
 
 
 
 
 
 
 
 
 
 
 
 
 718 Erida
 
 163 Erigone
 636 Erika
 
 
 
 
 
 
 
 
 
 
 
 
 
 5331 Erimomisaki
 
 
 
 
 
 
 
 
 
 
 
 462 Eriphyla
 136199 Eris
 
 
 
 
 
 705 Erminia
 
 406 Erna
 
 698 Ernestina
 
 
 
 
 
 
 
 
 
 433 Eros
 
 
 
 185638 Erwinschwab
 
 889 Erynia
 
 9950 ESA
 
 
 
 
 9909 Eschenbach
 
 
 1509 Esclangona
 
 
 
 
 
 
 1421 Esperanto
 
 2253 Espinette
 
 
 
 
 
 
 
 
 
 
 
 
 
 622 Esther
 1541 Estonia
 
 
 
 
 
 
 
 
 
 
 2032 Ethel
 331 Etheridgea
 
 
 
 
 
 
 
 
 
 
 
 1119 Euboea
 181 Eucharis
 
 4354 Euclides
 
 
 217 Eudora
 
 
 4063 Euforbo
 
 45 Eugenia
 
 
 743 Eugenisis
 
 
 247 Eukrate
 495 Eulalia
 
 2002 Euler
 
 5436 Eumelos
 
 7152 Euneus
 
 185 Eunike
 15 Eunomia
 630 Euphemia
 
 13963 Euphrates
 31 Euphrosyne
 
 5261 Eureka
 
 52 Europa
 
 4007 Euryalos
 527 Euryanthe
 3548 Eurybates
 
 75 Eurydike
 195 Eurykleia
 
 5012 Eurymedon
 79 Eurynome
 4501 Eurypylos
 
 27 Euterpe
 164 Eva
 
 
 
 
 
 
 
 
 
 
 
 
 
 
 
 
 
 503 Evelyn
 
 
 
 
 
 
 
 
 
 
 
 
 
 
 1569 Evita

See also 
 List of minor planet discoverers
 List of observatory codes

References 
 

Lists of minor planets by name